Edward Brown Glass  was an  Anglican priest: the Archdeacon of Man from 1964 until 1978.

Born on 1 July 1913, he was educated at King Williams College on the island and Durham University and ordained in 1938.  After curacies in Rochdale and Gorton he held incumbencies at Heywood, Ramsey and Castletown before his Archdeacon’s appointment.

He died on 2 June 1995.

References

1913 births
People educated at King William's College
Alumni of St John's College, Durham
Archdeacons of Man
1995 deaths